Niruttara (English:Unanswered) is a 2016 Indian Kannada romantic drama film written & directed by Apoorva Kasaravalli, making his debut, and produced by actress Bhavana and Aravind Ramanna. The film revolves around four main characters played by Rahul Bose, in his debut Kannada film, Bhavana, Kiran Srinivas and Aindrita Ray. The film's soundtrack and score is composed by Niladri Kumar, a classical musician making his film debut. Whilst the cinematography is by H. M. Ramachandra, the sound design is by the Academy Award winner Resul Pookutty, making his debut in Kannada films.

The plot revolves around the four characters about their relationships and journeys presented as an episodic catalogue.

Cast
 Rahul Bose as Pradeep
 Bhavana as Hamsa
 Kiran Srinivas as Achinth
 Aindrita Ray as Shravya

Soundtrack
The film's score and soundtrack is composed by Pandit Niladri Kumar who is best known as a sitar player in Indian classical and fusion music. The album is distributed by Lahari Music.

References

External links 

 Niruttara Official promo in Youtube

2016 films
2010s Kannada-language films
Indian drama films
2016 directorial debut films